The following lists the top 50 albums of 1996 in Australia from the Australian Recording Industry Association (ARIA) End of Year Albums Chart.

Peak chart positions from 1996 are from the ARIA Charts, overall position on the End of Year Chart is calculated by ARIA based on the number of weeks and position that the records reach within the Top 50 albums for each week during 1996.

Notes

References

Australian record charts
1996 in Australian music
1996 record charts